The Time Lords are a fictional humanoid species originating on the planet Gallifrey, seen in the British science fiction television series Doctor Who. Time Lords are so called because they are able to travel in and manipulate time through prolonged exposure to the time vortex.

Details of the history of the Time Lords in the television series are sketchy and, as is usual for Doctor Who continuity, fraught with supposition and contradiction. This history covers the various versions given on screen and in the spin-off media based on the television series.

On screen

What little has actually been established on screen, arranged roughly in chronological order, is as follows:

Before Time Lord society was founded, Gallifrey was inhabited by an indigenous species called Shobogans. Tecteun, a Shobogan scientist and explorer, helped develop space travel and the Shobogans began to explore the universe. During her travels, Tecteun found a gateway on a distant planet, said to be the boundary to another dimension, and discovered an abandoned child whom she adopted. After an accident, the child (who would come to be known as "The Timeless Child") was shown to possess the unique genetic ability to repair bodily damage and even survive death by rewriting their entire physiology. Tecteun experimented on the child and was eventually able to replicate this ability among a subset of the population who would go on to become the Time Lords, granting them the power of regeneration. Using a chameleon arch, the Timeless Child had its memory wiped and its regenerative abilities limited, becoming a seemingly-ordinary Time Lord who would eventually become the renegade known as The Doctor. This account was redacted and its records in the Matrix obscured, with Rassilon taking credit for regeneration and Tecteun disappearing into obscurity as the mysterious figure in Time Lord mythology sometimes referred to as "The Other". From the shadows, Tecteun would go on to found and run The Division - a multi-species taskforce 
created in secret by the Time Lords to shape the course of history in the universe to their liking while the Great Houses maintained a policy of non-intervention.

The Time Lords became the masters of time travel. Many years later, one of their number, the scientist Omega, created an energy source to power their experiments in time. To this end, Omega used a stellar manipulation device, the Hand of Omega, to rework a nearby star into a new form to serve as that source. Unfortunately, the star flares into a supernova, then collapses into a black hole. Omega is thought killed in the explosion, but somehow survives in an antimatter universe beyond the black hole's singularity.

The founder of Time Lord society, however, and its most revered figure, is Rassilon. Rassilon's name is used frequently throughout Time Lord legend and culture, and is applied to many artifacts of power. Rassilon takes a singularity (assumed by fans and the spin-off media to be the same one as Omega's) and places it beneath the Time Lords' citadel on Gallifrey. This perfectly balanced Eye of Harmony then serves as the power source for their civilisation as well as their time machines.

The early part of Time Lord history is known as the Dark Time, when the first Time Lords abuse their powers over time by manipulating lesser species. Among these abuses is the use of the Time Scoop to abduct beings from throughout history to participate in gladiatorial games (with the exception of such races as Daleks and Cybermen who "play the game too well" and are thus considered too dangerous to be used) in an area of Gallifrey known as the Death Zone.

During his rule, Rassilon leads the Time Lords in a war against the Great Vampires, a war so horrific that the Time Lords forswear violence from that point on. The weapons used by the Time Lords against the vampires in that war include Bowships that fired giant bolts through the Great Vampires' hearts. The Doctor encounters a surviving vampire in E-Space in the serial State of Decay.

Eventually, Rassilon dies, or is deposed; contradictory legends surround his demise. His body is placed in the Dark Tower in the Death Zone, which becomes known as the Tomb of Rassilon.

Over 4.6 billion years prior to 2007 AD, the Time Lords wipe out the Racnoss. The surviving Racnoss escape in their ship, which drifts into the Solar System and eventually forms the core of the planet Earth.

At some point in their history, the Time Lords interact with the civilisation of the planet Minyos, giving them advanced technology. This has disastrous results, with the Minyans destroying themselves in a series of nuclear wars.

Apparently as a result of this, the Time Lords adopt an official policy of neutrality and non-interference, acting only as observers save in cases of great injustice.  But given the existence of the Celestial Intervention Agency and of renegade Time Lords such as the Doctor, the Master, the Meddling Monk, the Rani and the War Chief, the policy seems to have frequently been breached (although it has been mentioned that such interference by 'renegades' carries the Death penalty). The Time Lords also have a shadow organization known as the Division which acts outside their neutrality protocol when necessary and employs agents of other species, the Doctor revealed to be a former agent prior to becoming the First Doctor.

The Time War

Much of the revived series features arcs touching on the Time War and the supposed destruction of Gallifrey.

In "The End of the World" (2005), the Ninth Doctor reveals that Gallifrey has been destroyed in a "war" his people lost and that he is the last of the Time Lords. In "Dalek" (2005), the Ninth Doctor further reveals that the "Last Great Time War" involved the Dalek race and the Time Lords, and that both sides were obliterated in the final battle. Executive producer Russell T Davies wrote in issue #356 of Doctor Who Magazine that the Time War in the series and the one in the novels are unrelated.

In "The Satan Pit" (2006), the Beast identifies the Tenth Doctor as "[t]he killer of his own kind." In "The Sound of Drums" (2007), the Tenth Doctor confirms his involvement in killing all of the Time Lords when he says that he was the only one that could end the War and that he had tried "everything". In "The Stolen Earth" (2008), the Tenth Doctor reveals that the entire Time War is "time locked", which means it is theoretically impossible to enter.

The 2009–2010 two-part special "The End of Time" reveals more about the conclusion of the Time War. The Time Lords are depicted as planning on eradicating the material universe in order to win the war, hoping to live on as beings of pure consciousness, in a manoeuvre Rassilon dubs "the Final Sanction". The Time Lord High Council is warned that the Doctor that fought in the Time War is in possession of a weapon called "the Moment" and is willing to use it to prevent this happening. When the Master opens the time lock of the War, the Time Lords intend to carry out the Final Sanction, until the Tenth Doctor and the Master together reseal the events of the Time War within the lock. Rassilon describes Time Lord history in this story as having lasted "a billion years" up until the end of the Time War.

"The Day of the Doctor" (2013) shows these last days from the point of view of the War Doctor, the incarnation of the Doctor born at that time. The Moment, itself sentient, brings the War Doctor into his own future where he meets the Tenth and Eleventh Doctors, and together, they are able to freeze Gallifrey and the Time Lords in time and put them into a "parallel pocket universe", causing the Daleks to destroy themselves. However, because of the time streams being out of sync, the War Doctor realises this means that he will still have to live the memory of burning Gallifrey, even though he actually tried to save it.

The Return of Gallifrey 
In "The Time of the Doctor" (2013), the Time Lords reach out to the universe through a crack in time on the planet Trenzalore, broadcasting the message "Doctor who?" through time and space to draw the Doctor in. They also send through a truth field so that when the Doctor arrives he will say his real name, with the field making sure it's the real one, which will be a signal for them to return. As "half the universe" are at Trenzalore waiting for this, the Eleventh Doctor refuses as it will restart the Time War. When a very old and frail Doctor goes to meet his demise at the hands of the Daleks, Clara Oswald begs the Time Lords through the crack to intervene, and the Time Lords grant the Doctor a new regeneration cycle through the crack before closing it, changing the Doctor's future and allowing him to defeat the Daleks and save Trenzalore.

In "Hell Bent" (2015), Gallifrey is revealed to have come back from the pocket universe it was frozen in and exists at the end of the universe. The Twelfth Doctor, backed by Gallifrey's armed forces, deposes and banishes Rassilon from Gallifrey as revenge for the Doctor's imprisonment, and shortly afterwards runs away by stealing a TARDIS from beneath the Capitol's Cloisters.

In "Spyfall" (2020), the Master reveals that he returned to Gallifrey, slaughtered the population and devastated the planet in his rage over discovering the truth about the Time Lord's origins and the identity of the Timeless Child. Later, in "The Timeless Children" (2020), the Master lures the Thirteenth Doctor back to Gallifrey, opening a path for the Cybermen to invade and convert the bodies of deceased Time Lords to create CyberMasters - a subrace of Cybermen capable of regeneration. The Doctor, after being shown the truth about their past, plants an explosive in the Citadel, seemingly destroying the CyberMasters and the Master.

Spin-off media

Ancient history

New Adventures

Of the many, sometimes contradictory, accounts of Time Lord history, the most developed single vision may have been  seen in the licensed spin-offs, in particular the Virgin New Adventures and Virgin Missing Adventures novels and, to a lesser degree of consistency, their successors, the BBC Books Doctor Who novels. 

The Virgin novels,  and by extension the BBC novels,  took heavily from the so-called "Cartmel Masterplan" devised by former Doctor Who script editor Andrew Cartmel, which was supposed to explain the Doctor's origins and his ties to Gallifrey's ancient history.  Elements of the Masterplan  were supposed to be revealed over the course of Cartmel's tenure on the series, but ultimately, as the programme ceased production in 1989, only hints of it  surfaced in Seasons 25 and 26 and were never made explicit. 

According to the novels,  some millions of years ago the planet Gallifrey is home to a civilisation that can see all of the past and future. Ancient Gallifrey is also a matriarchy, ruled over by a mystical religion consisting of a cult built around the Pythia, a great and powerful priestess. Among the ancient Gallifreyans are time-sensitives, marked by their red hair, who pilot early Gallifreyan time machines. Rassilon is rumoured to have been one of these time pilots, who are known as Heroes (as much a title as a term of adulation). Rassilon, as a scientist, opposes the religious and monarchical power wielded by the Pythia. 

Gallifrey begins its wars against the Great Vampires during this period. Rassilon commands a fleet of Bowships that wins the first war and his rationalist movement gains popular and political support as a result. 

The rule of the Pythia is finally overthrown by Rassilon and two other scientists, Omega and "the Other", a mysterious figure whose actual name has been lost to history. This marks the start of the Intuitive Revolution, turning Gallifrey into a society based on rationality and a republic with an elected President, although a caste system remains. The three are ultimately responsible for Gallifrey's move towards a purely scientific society. 

However, when overthrown the Pythia curses the people with sterility before casting herself into an abyss. The curse results in the still birth that night of every unborn child on Gallifrey, including Rassilon's own son. Persecuted, her priestesses and acolytes flee to a nearby planet where they become the Sisterhood of Karn.

The Pythia's curse forces Rassilon to find a new way to reproduce, leading him to create the Looms, cloning machines that can create new Gallifreyans to replace the dead. The Looms are eventually incorporated into great Houses of Cousins, to regulate the population levels and organise the new society. Time Lords are born fully grown from the Looms, although they still need to be educated.  Though with the stories, flashbacks and depictions of the Doctor and Master as children, mentions of both the Doctor and the Master having parents, the Doctor being a self-described father or dad, the Master mentioning a daughter, the appearance of children on Gallifrey during the Time War, and the Eleventh Doctor describing a cot he brings out of the TARDIS as where he once slept, the idea of the fully grown Time Lord as well as the Looms is questionable.

Rassilon, with the assistance of Omega and the Other, applies transdimensional engineering to the creation of TARDIS technology. Omega then proceeds to concentrate completely on his time travel experiments. The Other's role is unclear, but he seems to have held the alliance between Rassilon and Omega together, and is a part of the project that produces the Hand of Omega. Omega uses the Hand on the star Qqaba (named in the comic strip Star Death by Alan Moore, DWM #47 and the novel The Infinity Doctors by Lance Parkin), and vanishes, presumed dead, in the resulting supernova which creates the Eye of Harmony. Rassilon then takes control of both the Eye and Gallifreyan society, and the Time Lords are now able to live up to their name. 

Eventually, Rassilon's rule becomes dictatorial and reaches the point where he becomes obsessed with implementing his reforms and preserving Gallifreyan society as he sees it before the end of his life. Despite the Other's protests, bloody purges begin, and Rassilon begins to dabble in immortality. Meanwhile, knowing that Rassilon will hold his family hostage to secure his cooperation, the Other tells his granddaughter Susan to go into hiding. He then literally throws himself into the Looms, disintegrating and spreading his genetic code into the machines. 

A year later, the Doctor arrives in his "borrowed" TARDIS from Gallifrey's future and discovers Susan on the streets of the city, where she has been living since failing to make it off-world. Somehow, Susan recognises him as her grandfather and he also knows her name. The Doctor then leaves Gallifrey's past, taking Susan with him into his exile.  Many of the novels (especially Lungbarrow and The Infinity Doctors) have implied that the Doctor may be the Other, genetically reincarnated from the Looms.

Rassilon, now absolute ruler of Gallifrey, leads the Time Lords in further wars against the Great Vampires and other otherdimensional beings released because of the use of time travel, whom he considers dangerous to the universe. Aside from the Bowships, the Time Lords also use N-Forms, extra-dimensional war machines developed by the Patrexes chapter that attack planets where they detected the presence of vampires. The Doctor encounters a reactivated N-form in the Virgin New Adventures novel Damaged Goods, by Russell T Davies.

The novels Goth Opera by Paul Cornell, and Blood Harvest by Terrance Dicks, suggest that Rassilon becomes a vampire himself to attain eternal life, a belief shared by a Gallifreyan cult also seen in Cornell's comic strip story Blood Invocation.

Eventually, the Pythia's curse is lifted with the arrival of the Fourth Doctor's companion Leela on Gallifrey. Leela falls in love and marries a Gallifreyan, Andred, and at the conclusion of the novel Lungbarrow is pregnant — the first naturally conceived child on Gallifrey for millennia.

Big Finish Productions
In the Big Finish Productions audio play Zagreus, a historical simulation shows the existence of a vampiric race connected with Gallifrey which Rassilon destroys in his purges.

The Big Finish Productions audio play Gallifrey: The Inquiry reveals further details of the Time Lord encounter with the Minyans: it is actually the secret test of a Time Lord timeonic fusion device that destroys Minyos, an incident that is covered up by the High Council and leads to their policy of non-interference.

Later history
The recent history of Gallifrey has been referred to in the spin-off media as well as the television series. In addition to the uncertain canonicity of the spin-offs, where these various events fit on a time line, or even if they can be consolidated into a single one, is also unclear. The spin-off media  have also suggested  that they  each take place in separate continuities.

Audio plays
Echoing similar events in the novels, the Fourth Doctor's former companion, Romana, returns from E-Space (where she remained at the end of Warriors' Gate) and rises to become President of the High Council. She is subsequently captured and imprisoned by the Daleks on the Etra Prime planetoid for twenty years until she escapes on the eve of their invasion of Gallifrey. The Dalek invasion is repelled with the help of the Sixth Doctor, although the Daleks manage to take control of the Seriphia galaxy, using it as a new power base. Romana reassumes her position as Lord President. The Doctor Who Annual 2006 article "Meet the Doctor" by Russell T Davies refers to the Etra Prime Incident of the audio play The Apocalypse Element as what is claimed to be what began the "escalation of events" before the Time War began.

Her tenure, however, is far from smooth. In the Gallifrey audio series, the emergence of a terrorist group known as Free Time, which wants to break the technological monopoly on time travel, threatens not just Gallifrey, but its time travel-capable allies. Romana's progressive policies, including opening the Academy to non-Gallifreyans, face opposition from more conservative elements. The escape of Pandora — an evil from Gallifrey's past — from the Matrix further complicated matters. Indeed, it is eventually revealed that Pandora is manipulating the Free Time zealots. 

Although Romana initially wards off an attempted coup by Inquisitor Darkel, Pandora manages to manifest herself in the form of Romana's first incarnation. Both Romanas claim the title of Imperiatrix, absolute ruler of Gallifrey, and their conflict plunges the planet into civil war. Romana II is eventually able to eliminate the Pandora entity, at the cost of the destruction of the Matrix. Romana is then removed from the Presidency and replaced by a Time Lord named Matthias. The series ends on a cliffhanger, with Gallifrey on the brink of economic and social collapse as well as in danger of being overrun by a Free Time virus, while most of the cast are trapped with no apparent means of escape.

Eighth Doctor Adventures
In the BBC Books Eighth Doctor Adventures, Romana regenerates into a third incarnation, a more martial and war-like ruler looking ahead to a predicted future war with an unnamed Enemy.  In The Ancestor Cell, the Eighth Doctor apparently destroys Gallifrey and retroactively wipes the Time Lords from history to prevent the voodoo cult Faction Paradox from starting that war.

In the last regular Eighth Doctor novel, The Gallifrey Chronicles by Lance Parkin, it is revealed that while Gallifrey is destroyed, the Time Lords are not erased from history. However, the cataclysm sets up an event horizon in time that prevents anyone from entering Gallifrey's relative past or travelling from it to the present or future. Some Time Lords, however, may have survived,  including Iris Wildthyme, the Master and the Minister of Chance from Death Comes to Time.

The memories of the Time Lords also survive within the Matrix, which has been downloaded into the Eighth Doctor's mind, but their reconstruction will require a sufficiently advanced computer. At the novel's end, the question of whether or not the Time Lords would be restored remained unanswered.

Notes

References

External links
Rassilon, Omega, and that Other guy

 
Time Lords